Hjorth is a surname. Notable people with the surname include:

Bror Hjorth (1894–1968), Swedish artist
Greg Hjorth (1963–2011), Australian mathematician and chess player
Jesper Hjorth (born 1975), Danish footballer
Maria Hjorth (born 1973), Swedish golfer
Vigdis Hjorth (born 1959), Norwegian novelist

See also
6119 Hjorth, a main-belt asteroid
Hjorth Hill, a mountain of Victoria Land, Antarctica